John J. Connelly (ca. 1923-1929-August 17, 2013 in Needham, Massachusetts) was the head coach for Northeastern University's Northeastern Huskies baseball team from 1956 to 1981. He was nicknamed "Tinker".

Early life
Connelly graduated Newton High School in 1946. He attended Northeastern University, where he played football as a quarterback, hockey as a defenseman and baseball as a second baseman. He led the football team to an undefeated season in 1951 and was captain of the 1952 baseball team. He graduated in 1953.

Coaching career
His career record with the team was 288-280-6. He was named the New England Coach of the Year in 1964. He led the Huskies to the College World Series in 1966.

He was elected to the Northeastern University Athletics Hall of Fame in 1975 and the College Baseball Hall of Fame in 1984.

References

2013 deaths
Northeastern Huskies baseball coaches
1920s births